Sharkan (Šarkan) is a rural locality (a selo) and the administrative center of Sharkansky District, Udmurtia, Russia. Population:

References

Notes

Sources

Rural localities in Udmurtia
Sarapulsky Uyezd